Association Sportive Niamey, commonly referred to as AS Niamey, is  a Nigerien association football club based in Niamey. AS Niamey has won the Niger Premier League three times in his history .

Stadium
Currently the team plays at the 30000 capacity Stade Général Seyni Kountché.

Performance in CAF competitions
CAF Champions League: 1 appearance
2003 – First Round

Honours
Niger Premier League: 1980, 1981, 1982

See also
CAF Champions League 2003

References

External links
 
 

Niamey
Niamey
Sport in Niamey